War Chhod Na Yaar is a 2013 Indian Hindi-language war comedy film that was directed and written by Faraz Haider, with dialogue written by Deepak Kingrani.  The film was announced on 30 March 2013 with a launch party at the Novotel Hotel in the presence of the lead actors, Sharman Joshi, Soha Ali Khan, Javed Jaffery, Sanjai Mishra, Dalip Tahil, and Mukul Dev.

The movie was produced by AOPL Entertainment Pvt Ltd and was released on 11 October 2013.

Plot 

Captains Rajveer Singh Rana (Sharman Joshi) and Qureshi (Javed Jaffrey), who are military captains of India and Pakistan respectively, are playing cards with their partners at India-Pakistan border when a bomb explodes. Seventeen  hours before, the Defence Minister of India called reporter Ruth Dutta (Soha Ali Khan) to talk about some top secret information, and says after two days, war will be declared between India and Pakistan. Fourteen  hours before the explosion, the Defence minister of Pakistan and the Pakistani General contact the Defence minister of China for some help. The Defence minister of China says he will attack  New Delhi with a nuclear bomb. At the India-Pakistan border, the Pakistani army is becoming very lazy; the troops ignore commander Khan (Sanjay Mishra). On the battlefield, Captains Singh and Quereshi and their troops form a friendship and camaraderie based on a love of conversations and playing antakshari, a game of Hindi film songs and foods. Ruth Dutta, a television news reporter arrives to make a documentary about the lives of the soldiers of the two sides. When war between the two countries is declared, the friendship between the two sides is tested and conspiracy theories are hatched.

Cast 

 Sharman Joshi as Captain Rajveer Singh Rana (Raj) of the Indian Army
 Soha Ali Khan as Ruth Dutta, reporter of GBC news
 Javed Jaffrey as Captain Qureshi of the Pakistan Army
 Dalip Tahil as Defence Minister of India/Pakistan/China and United States
 Mukul Dev as Ghuspetia
 Sanjay Mishra as Commander Khan of Pakistan Army
Ram Awana as member of Pakistani team
 Vivek Rana as Lt. Sahil Khatri
 Avantika Khatri as Sakshi 
 Manoj Pahwa as Pakistani General
 Badrul Islam as Gaderya

Soundtrack

The Soundtrack of the film was released on 23 September 2013 along with its trailer with music composed by Aslam Keyi and lyrics by Bebak Amrohi, Azeem Shirazi & Faraz Haider.

Earning
The movie performed average on the box office it was made on a budget of Rs 14 crore. Released in 754 screens in India, the movie also hit screens in some parts of the Middle East and Malaysia.

References

External links 
 

2010s Hindi-language films
2010s war comedy films
Indian war comedy films
2013 films
India–Pakistan relations in popular culture
Indian Army in films
Indian political satire films
Military of Pakistan in films
2013 comedy films